The Marshall Baronetcy was a title in the Baronetage of Nova Scotia.  It was created on 21 May 1658 for William Marshall.  The title became extinct on the death of the fourth Baronet in 1816.

Marshall baronets (1658)
Sir William Marshall, 1st Baronet ( – 1658)
Sir George Marshall, 2nd Baronet (died )
Sir William Marshall, 3rd Baronet (died 1772)
Sir Charles Marshall, 4th Baronet (died 1816)

References

Extinct baronetcies in the Baronetage of Nova Scotia